The Kyocera Inamori Classic was a golf tournament on the LPGA Tour from 1980 to 1993. It was played at several different courses in California, mostly in the San Diego area.

Jane Blalock's streak of 299 consecutive cuts made, an all-time LPGA Tour record, ended at the 1980 Inamori Golf Classic when she shot rounds of 78 and 76.

Tournament locations

Winners
Kyocera Inamori Classic
1993 Kris Monaghan

Inamori Classic
1992 Judy Dickinson
1991 Laura Davies

Red Robin Kyocera Inamori Classic
1990 Kris Monaghan
1989 Patti Rizzo

San Diego Inamori Golf Classic
1988 Ayako Okamoto

Kyocera Inamori Golf Classic
1987 Ayako Okamoto

Kyocera Inamori Classic
1986 Patty Sheehan
1985 Beth Daniel

Inamori Classic
1984 No tournament
1983 Patty Sheehan
1982 Patty Sheehan
1981 Hollis Stacy

Inamori Golf Classic
1980 Amy Alcott

References

Former LPGA Tour events
Golf in California
Sports competitions in San Diego
Sports competitions in San Diego County, California
Sports in San Jose, California
Recurring sporting events established in 1980
Recurring sporting events disestablished in 1993
1980 establishments in California
1993 disestablishments in California
Women's sports in California